() is an honorific in the Low Countries denoting the lowest rank within the nobility. In the Netherlands, this in general concerns a prefix used by the untitled nobility. In Belgium, this is the lowest title within the nobility system, recognised by the Court of Cassation. It is the cognate and equivalent of the German noble honorific , which was historically used throughout the German-speaking part of Europe, and to some extent also within Scandinavia.

The abbreviation of the honorific is jhr., and that of the female equivalent jkvr., which is placed before the given name and titles.

Honorific of nobility 
In the Middle Ages, such a person was a young and unmarried child of a high-ranking knight or nobleman. Many noble families could not support all their sons to become a knight, because of the expensive equipment. So the eldest son of a knight was a young lord, while his brothers remained as esquires.

However, in the Low Countries (and other parts of continental Europe), in most cases the head of most noble families carries a title, inheritance being by male lineage. As a result, most of the nobility is untitled in the Netherlands. , or its female equivalent , developed therefore quite early into a different but general meaning: an honorific to show that someone does belong to the nobility but does not possess a title. The abbreviation jhr. (for men) or jkvr. (for women) is placed in front of the name, preceding academic but not state titles.

The honorific could be compared more or less with "" in Austria or "" in Germany, though due to circumstances of German and especially Prussian history, "Junker" assumed connotations of militarism absent from the Dutch equivalent. Ranking this with the British nobility, it is roughly comparable to "The Honourable" when the untitled person is a son or daughter of a baron, viscount, or the younger son of an earl; or "Lord" or "Lady" when the person belongs to the old untitled but high-ranking (Dutch) nobility from before 1815 (e.g. "Heer van X" or Lord of X).

Title of nobility 
 is, in Belgium, the lowest title and an official Dutch mark of status (not a title), as stated above, and is used as such, most notably by members of the Dutch royal family with the style Jonkheer van Amsberg.

Coronet 

The coronet of rank for the untitled nobility in the Netherlands and Belgium is the same as that for the rank of a hereditary knight, i.e. : a plain circlet of gold with eight golden points, each topped with a pearl; five of them are seen in a representation. Furthermore, the golden circlet of the heraldic coronet is surrounded with a pearl collar.

Unrecognised titleholders use the same coronet of rank as hereditary knights, described above. Unrecognised titles cannot officially use a coronet of rank and thus use the coronet that they have been historically awarded, if any at all.

Jonker 
 (old Dutch spelling joncker) is another form of the word . During the Dutch Republic this was however the primary designation given to the untitled – and office-bearing – nobles in the Netherlands. Later (especially in the 17th and 18th century) these jonkers often went calling themselves "Baron" after the German example, which was adopted by most of these noble families when the Kingdom of the Netherlands was established. At present, the variant title is still used to indicate a jonkheer, but most of these modern "jonkers", or thus jonkheren, however, often do not originate from the older untitled nobility, but from the Dutch urban and non-noble patriciate which were elevated into the newly instituted nobility during the foundation of the Kingdom of the Netherlands.

Nickname 
The best-known use of the honorific among English-speaking people is as the root of the name of the city of Yonkers, New York. The word was probably a nickname, as opposed to an honorific, associated with Adriaen van der Donck; a young Dutch lawmaker, pioneering politician and landowner in New Netherland. While his business ventures largely proved less than successful, the city of Yonkers takes its name from his steadfast work in the formation of the state of Manhattan itself.

The word, in reference to Van der Donck, is variously spelled among modern scholars. In Thomas F. O'Donnell's introduction to a translation of van der Donck's A Description of the New Netherland, it is suggested that van der Donck was known as "The Joncker". Russell Shorto's The Island at the Center of the World has "jonker", while Edward Hagaman Hall's book on Philipse Manor Hall uses "youncker".

Jonker Street in Malacca, Malaysia, which derives its name from Dutch, can be traced back to when the Dutch ruled Malacca from 1641 to 1798.

See also 
 
 
 Nobility
 Patricianship
 New Netherland
 
 Yonkers, New York

References 

 

Dutch words and phrases
Noble titles
New Netherland
Noblemen
Belgian noble titles
Dutch noble titles